Kiss Me, Kill Me is a 2015 American neo-noir mystery thriller film directed by Casper Andreas and written by David Michael Barrett, who both produced under their banner, Spellbound Productions. The film follows Dusty (Van Hansis) who, while confronting his unfaithful boyfriend, blacks out. When he comes to, his boyfriend Stephen (Gale Harold) has been murdered, and Dusty is the prime suspect. Kiss Me, Kill Me had its world premiere on September 18, 2015, at Reeling: The Chicago LGBTQ+ International Film Festival, which featured the film as its Spotlight Selection.

Plot
Stephen Redding is a successful reality television producer with a big house in the hills and a trophy boyfriend, Dusty Young. But at Stephen's birthday party, Dusty discovers he has been having an affair with another man, Craigery. Humiliated, Dusty leaves the party, walks down to a convenience store. Stephen follows; trying to explain the affair is over, but out of nowhere—Dusty sees a flash—and blacks out.

When he comes to, Dusty learns Stephen was murdered and he's the prime suspect. LAPD Detectives Annette Riley and Noah Santos question him. But Dusty cannot remember what happened. However, West Hollywood is filled with suspects: an unstable lawyer, a couples’ therapist, a jealous ex, a sketchy best friend, a resentful lesbian couple, and a drag queen hypnotist.

With the police closing in, he must remember what happened, put the pieces of the puzzle together, regardless where the truth leads, even if it means he did kill Stephen.

Cast
 Van Hansis as Dusty
 Gale Harold as Stephen (credited as Gale M. Harold III) 
 Brianna Brown as Amanda
 Yolonda Ross as Det. Riley
 Craig Robert Young as Jeffrey
 Jai Rodriguez as Det. Santos
 Matthew Ludwinski as Craigery
 Kit Williamson as Travis (also co-producer)
 D.J. "Shangela" Pierce as Jasmine
 Jackie Monahan as Danielle
 Allison Lane as Lori (also co-producer)
 Michael Maize as Albert
 Jonathan Lisecki as Kevin
 Deborah S. Craig as Donna
 Casper Andreas as Dr. Winters
 Katie Walder as Susan Lynwood

Casting
Producers Casper Andreas and David Michael Barrett cast the film with actors well known to LGBT audiences. Gale Harold, who plays Stephen, was the star of the Showtime series Queer as Folk. This film marks the first time he has played a gay character since the series concluded. Van Hansis, four-time Emmy Award nominee from As the World Turns and star of Logo's series EastSiders, is the film's leading man, Dusty. Many cast members in Kiss Me, Kill Me also appear in Eastsiders, including Brianna Brown (from Devious Maids), Jai Rodriguez (Emmy Award-winning star of Queer Eye for the Straight Guy), Jonathan Lisecki (writer-director-actor of Gayby) and Kit Williamson, a co-producer on the film, who created Eastsiders. Drag queen Shangela (D.J. Pierce), known for RuPaul's Drag Race, plays hypnotist Jasmine. Both Matthew Ludwinski and Allison Lane previously worked with Andreas, appearing in his film Going Down in LA-LA Land, and Deborah S. Craig appeared in Barrett's film Bad Actress. Notable cameos in the film include Katie Walder as television news reporter Susan Lynwood, and YouTube stars Will Shepherd and R.J. Aguiar who appear in the funeral scene. Pop singer SIRPAUL is featured in the nightclub scene singing his single "Kiss Me, Kill Me", and Andreas plays Dr. Winters.

Production
Initial funding for Kiss Me, Kill Me came through a crowdfunding campaign on Kickstarter, managed by producers Casper Andreas and David Michael Barrett. The successful campaign ran from October 6 to November 5, 2014, with 909 backers from all over the world. In the campaign, Andreas and Barrett explain the necessity for crowdsourcing as a viable means for producing LGBT content. They also credit their love of Alfred Hitchcock- and Agatha Christie-style murder mysteries as the inspiration for this film. Production began on January 7, 2015, for a 17-day shoot, predominantly in West Hollywood, California, where the film is set. The picture was shot on the Epic Red Dragon Camera by cinematographer, Rainer Lipski, edited by Andrew Gust, and original soundtrack was composed by Jonathan Dinerstein. Fredrik Malmberg, best known for producing the Conan the Barbarian reboot, is the film's executive producer. The Saul Bass-inspired animated opening titles sequence was created by graphic artist Scott McPherson. The film's taglines are "West Hollywood Is Murder" and "Coming Soon... with a BANG!"

Filming locations
Notable filming locations: Pink Dot, Here Lounge, West Hollywood, Andaz Hotel, West Hollywood, Odd Fellows Cemetery, Central City Stages, and other locations around Los Angeles.

Awards
 Audience Choice Award, 2015, QCinema Fort Worth's Gay & Lesbian International Film Festival
 Best Ensemble, 2015, QCinema Fort Worth's Gay & Lesbian International Film Festival
 Best Feature Film, 2016 QFest New Jersey LGBT Film & Digital Media Festival, Asbury Park, New Jersey
 Best Feature Film, 2016 FilmOut San Diego
 Best Ensemble, 2016 FilmOut San Diego
 Best Actor (Van Hansis), 2016 FilmOut San Diego
 Best Screenplay (David Michael Barrett), 2016 FilmOut San Diego
 Best Cinematography (Rainer Lipski), 2016 FilmOut San Diego
 Best Music/Soundtrack (Jonathan Dinerstein), 2016 FilmOut San Diego

Distribution
Kiss Me, Kill Me was released on DVD and Video on Demand through Embrem Entertainment on December 7, 2016. It is available to buy or stream on Amazon.com, iTunes, Vimeo, Google Play and other platforms.

References

External links
 
 Kiss Me, Kill Me crowdsourcing campaign on Kickstarter

2015 films
2015 crime thriller films
2015 independent films
2015 LGBT-related films
2015 psychological thriller films
2010s English-language films
2010s erotic thriller films
2010s mystery thriller films
2010s romantic thriller films
American crime thriller films
American erotic romance films
American erotic thriller films
American independent films
American LGBT-related films
American mystery thriller films
American neo-noir films
American psychological thriller films
American romantic thriller films
Erotic mystery films
Films set in Los Angeles County, California
Films shot in Los Angeles
Gay-related films
Kickstarter-funded films
Lesbian-related films
LGBT-related thriller films
2010s American films